Namhae Castle or Namhae Waesong (Hangul: 남해 선소왜성, Japanese: 南海 船所倭城) is a Japanese-style castle located on Namhae Island.  It was built and used during Hideyoshi's Invasions of Korea between 1593 and 1598.

External links
 https://web.archive.org/web/20070927075151/http://www.ngokim.pe.kr/imjin/imjin.htm
 http://www.ngokim.pe.kr/imjin/~LWF0013.bmp

Japanese-style castles in Korea
Castles in South Korea